Aengus is a masculine given name in Irish. It is composed of the Celtic elements meaning "one" and "choice". It is the Irish form of the Scottish Gaelic Aonghas, Aonghus (although Aonghus is also used as an alternative spelling of Aengus in Ireland). The names are derived from the Old Irish given name Oíngus.

These Gaelic names are Anglicised as Angus or, less frequently, as Aeneas.

The earliest form of these names occurs in Adomnán's Vita Columbae (Life of Columba) as Oinogusius, Oinogussius. According to historian Alex Woolf, the early Gaelic form of the name, Oengus, was borrowed from the British Pictish Onuist, which appears in British as Ungust. However, Oengus may have been used since the 5th century in Ireland, implying that the names Oengus and Onuist could have developed independently from each other. 

Woolf derived all these names from Celtic *Oinogustos, which linguist John Kneen analyzes as *oino-gustos meaning "one-choice". Woolf also stated that between about AD 350 and AD 660, the Insular Celtic dialects underwent changes which included the loss of the final syllables and unstressed vowels, transforming *Oinogustos to *Oingust.

People with the given name
Aengus Finnan, (born 1972), Canadian folk musician
Aengus Finucane, (1932–2009), Roman Catholic missionary of the Spiritan Fathers order
Aengus Fanning, (1942–2012), Irish journalist and former editor of farming of the Irish Independent
Aengus Mac Grianna (born 1964), newsreader
Aengus Ó Snodaigh, (born 1964), Irish Sinn Féin politician

References

Irish-language masculine given names